Maximum pressure campaign refers to the intensified sanctions against Iran by the Trump administration after the United States exited the Joint Comprehensive Plan of Action (JCPOA) in 2018. The campaign was aimed at pressuring Iran to renegotiate the JCPOA, adding more restrictions on Iran's nuclear program and expanding the scope of the agreement to cover Iran's ballistic missiles as well as other regional activities. This strategy was faced by Iran's counter pressure policy to thwart the U.S. maximum pressure campaign.

According to Human Rights Watch, the current economic sanctions "are causing unnecessary suffering to Iranian citizens afflicted with a range of diseases and medical conditions," despite exemptions for the humanitarian goods.

Sanctions

In May 2018, then U.S. president Donald Trump withdrew from the nuclear deal with Iran and imposed several new non-nuclear sanctions against Iran, some of which were condemned by Iran as a violation of the deal. In November 2018, the U.S. officially reimposed all sanctions against Iran that had been lifted before the U.S. withdrawal from the JCPOA.

Elizabeth Rosenberg, a former U.S. Treasury Department official told NPR that the program include sanctioning "some Iranian financial institutions not previously designated and that were previously used to facilitate food, medicine and medical imports." To this end, most large Iranian financial institutions are subject to the sanctions.

Outcomes
According to a report from the International Monetary Fund, Iran's Gross Official Reserves fell from an average of $70 billion in 2017 to $4 billion in 2020. Certain analysts believe the campaign has failed to change Iran's regional activities or counter Iran's proxy influence in the region, forcing Iran to renegotiate the nuclear deal and hindering its nuclear and missile programs. According to Senior officials in the administration of Ebrahim Raisi, president of Iran, oil sales in the initial months of Raisi's presidency have jumped by 40 percent despite being under "stringent US sanctions".

The campaign has been criticized by foreign policy outlets as being poorly conceived and counterproductive to other American foreign policy goals. David Wallsh, writing for the Atlantic Council, posited that "an exclusively punitive policy unaccompanied by diplomatic off-ramps incentivizes Tehran to fight fire with fire by imposing costs on its perceived aggressors." Sina Toossi, a senior analyst for the National Iranian American Council, further identified that the program may be largely ineffective in achieving diplomatic goals, with Iran's growing resilience to sanctions as well as the rise of hard-liners in the Iranian government who have little desire to engage diplomatically with the United States' demands.

Other concerns have been raised regarding the negative effect of the program on the welfare of the Iranian populace. According to the Human Rights Watch, the redoubled U.S. sanctions has effectively constrained Iran's "ability to finance [...] humanitarian imports", due to the broad U.S. sanctions against Iranian banks, accompanied by the "aggressive rhetoric from U.S. officials". The intensified sanctions have seriously threatened Iranians' right to health and access to essential medicines, causing documented shortages—ranging from a lack of vital drugs for patients with epilepsy to limited chemotherapy medications for treating Iranian cancer patients.

Reactions
The United Arab Emirates expressed its absolute support for the United States continuing the maximum pressure against Iran. Israeli politicians have also expressed support for the program.

The United Nations Special Rapporteur on Human Rights in Iran said in July 2019 that he was "not only concerned that sanctions and banking restrictions will unduly affect food security and the availability and distribution of medicines, pharmaceutical equipment and supplies, but is also concerned at their potential negative impact on United Nations and other operations and programs in the country."

In November 2021, during the presidency of Ebrahim Reisi and the beginning of a new round of nuclear talks, Ali Bagheri Kani, Iran's chief nuclear negotiator has said that in the seventh round of talks to revive the IAEA nuclear deal, the Islamic Republic of Iran called for the lifting of all sanctions against the US campaign of maximum pressure as a prelude to the resumption of talks.

See also
 Humanitarian impacts of U.S. sanctions against Iran
 Iranian frozen assets

References

Sanctions against Iran
Economy of Iran
Politics of Iran
Iran–United States relations
Presidency of Donald Trump